Visinin-like protein 1 is a protein that in humans is encoded by the VSNL1 gene.

This gene is a member of the visinin/recoverin subfamily of neuronal calcium sensor proteins. 

The encoded protein is strongly expressed in granule cells of the cerebellum where it associates with membranes in a calcium-dependent manner and modulates intracellular signaling pathways of the central nervous system by directly or indirectly regulating the activity of adenylyl cyclase. Alternatively spliced transcript variants have been observed, but their full-length nature has not been determined.

References

Further reading

EF-hand-containing proteins